This is a list of  Spanish words of various origins.  It includes words from Australian Aboriginal languages, Balti,  Berber, Caló, Czech, Dravidian languages, Egyptian, Greek, Hungarian, Ligurian, Mongolian, Persian, Slavic (such as Old Church Slavonic, Polish, Russian, and Croatian).  Some of these words existed in Latin as loanwords from other languages.  Some of these words have alternate etymologies and may also appear on a list of Spanish words from a different language.

Australian Aboriginal languages

canguro= kangaroo: from English kanguru, kangaroo, first recorded by Captain James Cook in 1770, from the Guugu Yimidhirr word gangurru.

Balti

polo= polo: from English polo (1872), from Balti polo, "ball," from the same family as Tibetan bo-lo "ball."

Berber

merino= type of sheep of North African origin bred in Spain: from Berber  Merīn (Modern Spanish Benimerines) the people of North Africa who originally bred this type of sheep.
moreno = brown, brunette, dark-skinned person: from moro, "a Moor," from Latin Maurus, from Ancient Greek Maúros, probably of Berber origin, but possibly related to the Arabic maghrib "west," which is possibly from the Semitic root '*gh-r-b'
moro = a Moor: see moreno above

Caló

calé= a gypsy: from Caló "Gypsy, speaker of Romany," see caló below
caló = Caló, also black, dark-colored: the word is possibly related to Sanskrit kanlanka "blemish, macula" and/or Ancient Greek kelainós "black."
cañí= Caló, gypsy: possibly from cali, feminine of calé and/or caló, see calé and caló above

Dravidian languages

brillante = brilliant, diamond: from brillar "to shine," see brillar below
brillar = to shine: possibly from Latin beryllus, "beryllium," from Ancient Greek beryllos (βήρυλλος), see abalorio above
mango= mango: from English mango, from Portuguese manga, from Tamil mānkāy (மன்கய்) "mango fruit," from mān "mango tree" + kāy "fruit."
mangosta = mongoose: from French mangouste, from Portuguese mangús, from Marathi mangūs (मंगूस) "mongoose," of Dravidian origin.
paliacate= handkerchief: shortened from pañuelo de Paliacate, "handkerchief from Paliacte," from Spanish name for Pulicat, a town in the Tiruvallur District, in the state of Tamil Nadu, India.  The Spanish pañuelo de Paliacate is a partial calque of French mouchoirs de Paliacate (1788).

The Real Academia Española (Spanish Royal Academy) notes that Paliacate comes from the Nahuatl language. Pal: colour Yacatl: nose.
paria= pariah, outcast: from Tamil paraiyan "pariah," literally "one who plays the drum,"  (the pariahs of south India were originally a caste of Untouchables that played drums ), from parai drum, possibly from parāi to speak.

Egyptian

aciago = unhappy, sad: probably from Latin aegyptius dies, "Egyptian day," from Ancient Greek Aigyptiakos (Αιγυπτιακός) "Egyptian" (adjective), from Aigyptos, see egipcio below.
barca = boat, launch, barge: from Late Latin barca, from Ancient Greek báris "flat-bottomed boat, launch" of Egyptian origin.
barco= boat, ship: from barca, see barca above
copto= a Copt, the Coptic language: from Arabic qubt, qibt, "Copts," from Coptic , "an Egyptian," from Ancient Greek Aigýptios "Egyptian" (adjective), see egipcio below
egipcio = an Egyptian, of Egypt: from Latin Aegyptius, from Aígyptus "Egypt," from Ancient Greek Aigyptos, from regional Egyptian Hikuptah, variant of Egyptian Hat-kaptah, one of the ancient names of Memphis, Egypt.
embarcar = to embark, to board a ship: from Late Latin imbarcare, from in- + barca, see barca above
gitano= a Gitano, a Gypsy: from Medieval Latin '*Aegyptanus, from Latin Aegyptus, see egipcio above.
papel = paper: from Catalán paper, from Latin papyrus, "paper, papyrus," see papiro below
papiro= papyrus: from Latin papyrus, from Ancient Greek pápyros, "papyrus," possibly of Egyptian origin.

Greek

Hungarian

coche = car: originally, a carriage pulled by two horses, ultimately from Hungarian kocsi "carriage, cart," short for kocsi szekér "carriage of Kócs," Hungarian city where carriages with suspension were first made.
sable = a sabre/saber (see spelling differences): from Old High German sabel, probably derived from Hungarian szablya (1393), literally "tool to cut with," from szabni "to cut."

Japanese

caqui = Diospyros plant, and its fruit, the persimmon: from Japanese kaki.
quimono = kimono: from Japanese kimono literally "thing to be put on," from ki "to put on, wear," + mono "thing, person."

Ligurian

hoz = sickle: from Latin falx "sickle, scythe," possibly from Ligurian.  For the change from f in falx to h in h'''oz see here.

Mongolian

 = a Mongol: from Mongolian Mongol "a Mongol," documented first in Chinese měng-kǔ, from uncertain source.
kan/jan = khan, an honorific title from Turko-Mongol

Persian

Aside from the fact that Persian words entered thru Latin, other words of Persian origin transmitted through Arabic through the Arab Muslim conquest of the Iberian peninsula during the Middle Ages.

ajedrez: chess, from Persian Shatranj from the Sanskrit Chaturang (four-armed) as was the shape of the original chess board in India, via From Arabic ash-shatranj (الشطرنج).
asesino = Assassin. From Arabic hashshshin "someone who is addicted to hashish (marijuana)," originally used to refer to the followers of the Persian Hassan-i-Sabah (حسن صباح), the Hashshashin.
ayatolá = from Persian آیت‌الله āyatollāh, from 'āyatullāh, "sign of God", from Arabic word Āyah pre-modified with the definite article al and post-modified with the word Allahazafrán = saffron, from Persian زعفران zaferān or زرپران zarparān, "gold strung", thru Arabic اَلزَّعْفَرَان az-za`farān.azúcar= sugar, from Persian shekar of the same meaning via Arabic (سكر) sukkar.
babucha= Slippers, babouche, from Persian "Papoosh"  پاپوش, literally meaning "foot covering" via Arabic Baboush  بابوش.
bazar= bazaar, from Persian بازار bāzār (="market").  
berenjena = eggplant, aubergine, from Persian بادنجان (bâdenjân), of the same meaning, via Arabic بَاذِنْجَان (bāḏenjān).
caravana = caravan, from Persian کاروان kārvān, a company of travelers, pilgrims, or merchants on a long journey through desert or hostile regions: a train of pack animals, thru Italian caravana, carovana.caravasar = caravanserai, caravansary,  kārvānsarāy is a Persian compound word combining kārvān "caravan" with sarāy "palace", "building with enclosed courts", from کاروان kārvān caravan + سرا sarā palace, large house, inn; an inn in eastern countries where caravans rest at night that is commonly a large bare building surrounding a court.
derviche = from Persian درویش darvish, a  member of a Sufi Muslim fraternity, literally translated "mendicant".
diván = from Persian دیوان dēvān (="place of assembly", "roster"), from Old Persian دیپی dipi (="writing, document") + واهانم  (="house")
escabeche: Pickle or marinade. From Persian Sekba via Arabic as-sukbaj. 
escarlata = scarlet: from Pers. سقرلات saqerlât "a type of red cloth". a rich cloth of bright color. a vivid red that is yellower and slightly paler than apple red
jazmín: jasmine. From Persian yasmin via Arabic.
kan/jan = from Persian khan
 meaning "inn", derives from Middle Persian hʾn (xān, “house”)
 an honorific title from Turko-Mongol, adapted to Persian
nenúfar: Water-lily. From Persian nilofer, niloofar, niloufar, via Arabic naylufar.
roque = rook (chess piece), from Persian رخ rukh via Arabic روخ rukh. 
sah = shah شاه shāh, from Old Persian 𐏋 χšāyaþiya (="king"), from an Old Persian verb meaning "to rule"
Teherán = Tehran (تهران Tehrân, Iranian capital), from  Persian words "Tah" meaning "end or bottom" and "Rân" meaning "[mountain] slope"—literally, bottom of the mountain slope.
tulipán = tulip, from Persian دلبند dulband Band = To close, To tie. 
turbante = turban, from Persian دلبند dulband Band = To close, To tie.

Slavic languages
cibelina, cebellina = sable: from Old French zibeline, zibelline, from Italian zibellino, of Slavic origin: compare Russian sobol and Polish sobol.
cuarzo = quartz: from German Quarz, from Old High German quarz, from a Western Slavic form *, from Slavic : compare Czech tvrdý "quartz, hard," Serbian: тврд / (tvrd) Polish twardy, and Russian tverdy

Serbian
vampire = vampire and vamp''' = a dangerously attractive woman: from Austrian German Vampyre "vampire," which in turn was borrowed from Serbian вампир (vampir), "vampire", "undead".

Czech
pistola = a pistol: from German Pistole "pistol," from Czech pištal, "pistol, tube."
calesa = kalesa, a carriage with low wheels and a folding cover: from French calèche, from German Kalesche, from Czech kolesa, "calesa, carriage," from kolesa "wheels," plural of koleso "wheel," from Proto-Slavic *kolo "wheel", IE root '*kwel-'

Polish
polaco = a Polack: from Polish pol- "field, wide and flat territory."
polka

Russian
babushka
rutenio = ruthenium: from Medieval Latin Ruthenia "Russia" (the element was discovered in the Urals), from Rutheni, Ruteni "Russians," from Old Russian Rus "Russia"
sputnik = satellite: from Russian s = with/from + put = road + -nik = derivative for objects of people carrying out an action (masc.)
vodka

Croatian
corbata = necktie, cravat: from Italian carvatta "wool scarf used by Croatian soldiers in the 17th century" with implicit sense "Croatian scarf," from Croatian hrvat "Croat, dof Croatia," of uncertain origin, but from the same root as Old Slavic Chǔrvatinǔ "Croat."

See also
Linguistic history of Spanish
List of English words of Spanish origin

References
"Breve diccionario etimológico de la lengua española" by Guido Gómez de Silva
Notes

various